Basirabad (also Romanized as Başīrābād, Basīrabād; also known as Başrābād) is a village in Jafarbay-ye Gharbi Rural District, Gomishan District, Torkaman County, Golestan Province, Iran. At the 2006 census, its population was 2,638, in 522 families.

References 

Populated places in Torkaman County